The Eastern New York State Soccer Association (ENYSSA) is the governing body of soccer in the eastern half of New York state, specifically the counties east of the Interstate 81 corridor.

History 
ENYSSA was founded in 1913 to serve as an organization to nurture and develop the sport of soccer in eastern New York. The purpose of the organization is encourage the development of the sport and encourage the growth of community leagues, organizations, clubs, programs, and teams in the state. This is so that the sport is accessible to all New Yorkers. ENYSSA's additional purposes are to promote and foster sportsmanship, as well as organize tournaments.

The first formations of the ENYSSA began on March 25, 1886, with the foundation of the New York State Football Association (NYSFA). The NYSFA was organized during a meeting at the Riverside Club Rooms in New York. The organization was founded with the founding of the following six clubs in New York:

 New York Riverside Football Club
 West Side Rovers
 Olympic Athletic Club
 The Pilgrims
 West Brighton
 Continental Clubs

The organization changed its name to the Southern New York Football Association in 1912, and then in 1913 became the current, Eastern New York State Soccer Association.

On December 22, 2017, in the wake of the 2018 United States Soccer Federation presidential election, Grant Wahl of Sports Illustrated reported that outgoing U.S. Soccer President, Sunil Gulati and Major League Soccer commissioner, Don Garber were campaigning for, and hosted a campaign dinner for Kathy Carter with members of ENYSSA. This sparked a potential conflict of interest given Carter's current role with Soccer United Marketing, and SUM's relationship with U.S. Soccer and MLS. Carter denied any collusion between her, Gulati and Garber.

Shortly after, Carter received the endorsement from ENYSSA and the New Jersey Soccer Association (NJSA). When asked on Twitter about the decision-making process to endorse Carter, the ENYSSA blocked several accounts on Twitter, only to revert the blocks and claiming their account was "hacked".

Presidents of ENYSSA 
There have been 10 presidents in the history of ENYSSA. The current president is Sal Rapaglia, who has been president of ENYSSA since 1990. Rapaglia was the previous president from 1979 until 1986.

Administration 
ENYSSA is governed by a board of directors that serve from August to July of the given calendar year. The current administration is as follows:

League structure 
ENYSSA administers the following leagues that are affiliated with the United States Adult Soccer Association.

 Cosmopolitan Soccer League
 Long Island Soccer Football League
 Eastern District Soccer League
 New York Metropolitan Women's Soccer League
 Central Brooklyn Soccer League
 Central New York State Soccer League
 ALLFUT

Cups 
ENYSSA administers the following cup competitions:

 Dr. Manning Cup – for all men's premier division ENYSSA clubs
 Jack Flamhaft Cup – for all men's first and second division ENYSSA clubs
 Livino D'Arpino Cup – for all men's third and reserve division ENYSSA clubs
 Lombardo Cup – for all women's ENYSSA clubs
 Fritz Marth Cup – for all over-30 clubs
 Rocco Amoroso Cup – for all over-40 clubs

Hall of Fame 
The ENYSSA administers a Hall of Fame for all individuals and players who have contributed to the sport in Eastern New York.

References

External links
 ENYSSA official site

State Soccer Associations
Soccer in New York (state)
1913 establishments in New York (state)
Organizations based in New York (state)
Organizations based in Yonkers, New York
Sports organizations established in 1913